Orbaff (also spelled Orbaf) is a village in southern Ivory Coast. It is in the sub-prefecture of Dabou, Dabou Department, Grands-Ponts Region, Lagunes District.

Orbaff was a commune until March 2012, when it became one of 1126 communes nationwide that were abolished.

Notes

Former communes of Ivory Coast
Populated places in Lagunes District
Populated places in Grands-Ponts